Perna is a village in central Croatia, in the municipality of Topusko, Sisak-Moslavina County.

Demographics
According to the 2011 census, the village of Perna has 176 inhabitants. This represents 37.37% of its pre-war population according to the 1991 census.

According to the 1991 census,  95.75% of the village population were ethnic Serbs (451/471), 0.22% were ethnic Croats (1/471), and 4.03% were of other ethnic origin (19/471).

Sights
 Monument to the uprising of the people of Kordun and Banija

See also 
 Glina massacres

References

Populated places in Sisak-Moslavina County
Serb communities in Croatia